Sclerodoris worki is a species of sea slug, a dorid nudibranch, shell-less marine opisthobranch gastropod mollusks in the family Discodorididae.

Description 
The maximum recorded body length is 50 mm.

Ecology 
Minimum recorded depth is 0 m. Maximum recorded depth is 0 m.

References

External links

Discodorididae
Gastropods described in 1967
Taxa named by Eveline Du Bois-Reymond Marcus
Taxa named by Ernst Marcus (zoologist)